Michael E. Burke (1854 – June 9, 1889) was an American Major League Baseball player who played mainly shortstop for the  Cincinnati Reds of the National League.  In 28 games, he had 26 hits in 117 at bats for a .222 batting average, scored 13 Runs, and hit three doubles.  He died at the age of 34 or 35 in Albany, New York, and is interred at St. Agnes Cemetery in Menands, New York.

References

External links

1854 births
1889 deaths
Baseball players from New York (state)
Major League Baseball shortstops
Cincinnati Reds (1876–1879) players
19th-century baseball players
Columbus Buckeyes (minor league) players
London Tecumseh players